Destiny Fulfilled... and Lovin' It was the final concert tour by American female R&B trio Destiny's Child, that visited Asia, Australia and North America.

History
The tour kicked off in Hiroshima, Japan on April 9, 2005 and ended Vancouver, Canada on September 10.

Destiny's Child embarked on the world tour sponsored by McDonald's Corporation, and performed hits such as "No, No, No", "Survivor", "Say My Name", "Independent Women" and "Lose My Breath".  In addition to renditions of the group's recorded material, they also performed songs from each singer's solo careers, most notably numbers from Beyoncé's debut album, Dangerously in Love.  The stage design afforded 360 degree viewing within the typical arena show venue.  Several interludes by the show's dancers allowed for the expected costume changes; those costumes, often glittering gowns, were designed by Tina Knowles, Beyoncé's mother, and manufactured by House of Deréon. A special set of outfits were designed as a tribute to the Broadway musical Dreamgirls, hinting at the play's "One Night Only (Disco)" scene where Deena Jones & the Dreams wear the same color pants suits.

Split-up announcement
During the last stop of their European tour in Barcelona on June 11, 2005, Kelly Rowland suddenly announced: "This is the last time you would see us on stage as Destiny's Child".

The announcement was surprising to many, as the trio had downplayed rumors of a split in the wake of Knowles' success, although prior plans had called for the members to focus on solo projects at the end of the tour.

Broadcasts and recordings
A performance from the tour was filmed in Atlanta at Philips Arena on July 15, 2005, and the resulting DVD Live in Atlanta was released on March 28, 2006. RIAA subsequently certified the DVD as Platinum. The concert was also aired in the USA on BET as a television special, on Channel 4 in the UK and on the Dutch television channel AT5.

Opening acts
Amerie (North America, select shows)
Mario (North America, select shows)
Darine Hadchiti (Dubai)
Tyra B. (North America, select shows)
Teairra Marí (New York City, Uniondale)
Keshia Chanté (Montreal, Toronto)
Chris Brown (Columbus)

Set list

"Say My Name"
"Independent Women, Part I"
"No, No, No, Part 2" / "Bug a Boo" / "Bills, Bills, Bills" / "Bootylicious" / "Jumpin', Jumpin'"
"Soldier" (contains elements of "Shout It Out")
"Dilemma" (Kelly Rowland solo)
"Do You Know" (Michelle Williams solo)
"Baby Boy"  / "Naughty Girl" (Beyoncé solo)
"Cater 2 U"
"Girl" (contains elements of "I'll Take You There")
"Free" / "If"
"Through With Love"
"Bad Habit" (Rowland solo)
"Dangerously in Love 2" (Beyoncé solo)
"Crazy in Love" (Beyoncé solo)
"Survivor"
Encore
"Lose My Breath"

Tour dates

Box office score data

Personnel

Creative Direction 
Beyoncé Knowles (Show Direction/Staging/Choreography)
Kelly Rowland (Show Direction/Staging/Choreography)
Michelle Williams (Show Direction/Staging/Choreography)
Kim Burse (Creative Director)
Frank Gatson Jr. (Show Direction/Creative Director/Choreography)

Choreographers 
Destiny's Child
Frank Gatson Jr.
LaVelle Smith Jr.

Production Manager
Harold Jones

Wardrobe and Stylist
Tina Knowles
Ty Hunter (Assistant Stylist)

Tour Manager
Alan Floyd
Omar Grant (Assistant Tour Manager)

Band
Lanar "Kern" Brantley (Musical Director, Bass)
Shawn Carrington (Guitar)
Jeff Motlet (Keyboards)
Luke Austin (Keyboards)
Gerald Heyward (Drums)

Dancers
Anthony Burrell (Male Dance Captain)
Aisha Francis (Female Dance Captain)
Renece Fincher
Melanie Lewis
Sherman Shoate
Kyausha Simpson
Bryan Tanaka
Robert Vinson
Tyrell Washington
Byron Carter

Security
Richard Alexander

Tour Promoters
Live Nation & Haymon Concerts – North America
AEG Live – Europe

Tour sponsors
McDonald's
BET''

See also
I'm Lovin' It campaign
Justified and Lovin' It Live – an additional tour sponsored by McDonald's for the "I'm Lovin' It" campaign
Live in Atlanta

External links
 Official website

Notes

References

2005 concert tours
Farewell concert tours